Orkla Mining Company Ltd. (Norwegian: Orkla Grube-Aktiebolag) was a Norwegian mining company established in 1904. The company was the largest mining company in Norway in the aftermath of World War I, and was among the world's largest pyrite producers. After closing of the mining operations in 1987, the company developed into the holding company Orkla ASA, which is among the largest companies at Oslo Stock Exchange.

History

Orkla Mining Co. Ltd. was established as a limited company at a constituting meeting in Stockholm on 7 December 1904. The purpose of the company was to acquire  mines in the Orkdalen district in Sør-Trøndelag and subsequently start operations. The share capital was applied for the acquirement of several 
mines from Christian Salvesen, including  Løkken Verk, Åmot gruve, Høidal gruve and Dragset Verk as well various properties at Orkanger and elsewhere in Orkdalen. Christian Salvesen together with  Wilhelm August Thams   had started Ørkedalens Mining in Meldal in 1867. 

 

The company bought a significant amount of shares of the company Chr. Salvesen & Chr. In 1913,  Swedish banker Marcus Wallenberg, Sr. became Chairman of the Board of Directors.

Following a period of exploration mining at the Løkken Mine, large-scale mining of pyrites was initiated. The mining community Løkken Verk was developed in Meldal and the Thamshavn Line (Thamshavnbanen) was constructed for transport of ore to the sea for export.
In 1931,  a smelting plant (now Elkem Thamshavn) at the port of Thamshavn started operations, based on the sulphur extraction process developed by Orkla. 
The Orkla Mining Company was the largest mining company in Norway in the interwar years, and among the world's largest pyrite producers. After the closing of mining operations at Løkken Mine in 1987, the company developed into the holding company Orkla Group.

References

Related reading
Odd Harald Hauge  (2014) Visst faen er det personlig Orkla - selskap og slagmark i mer enn 100 år (Oslo:Kagge Forlag AS)

External links
Orkla Industrial Museum website
Mining companies of Norway
Orkla ASA
Companies based in Trøndelag
Non-renewable resource companies established in 1904
Norwegian companies established in 1904